Gracilicutes (Latin: gracilis, slender, and cutis, skin, referring to the cell wall) is a clade in bacterial phylogeny.

Traditionally gram staining results were most commonly used as a classification tool, consequently until the advent of molecular phylogeny, the Kingdom Monera (as the domains Bacteria and Archaea were known then) was divided into four phyla,
 Gracilicutes (gram-negative, it is split in many groups, but some authors still use it in a narrower sense)
 Firmacutes [sic] (gram-positive, subsequently corrected to Firmicutes, today it excludes the Actinomycetota)
 Mollicutes (gram variable, later renamed Tenericutes and now Mycoplasmatota, e.g. Mycoplasma)
 Mendosicutes (uneven gram stain, "methanogenic bacteria" now known as methanogens and classed as Archaea)

This classification system was abandoned in favour of the three-domain system based on molecular phylogeny started by C. Woese.

Using hand-drawn schematics rather than standard molecular phylogenetic analysis, Gracilicutes was revived in 2006 by Cavalier-Smith as an infrakindgom containing the phyla Spirochaetota, Sphingobacteria (FCB), Planctobacteria (PVC), and Proteobacteria. It is a gram-negative clade that branched off from other bacteria just before the evolutionary loss of the outer membrane or capsule, and just after the evolution of flagella. Most notably, this author assumed an unconventional tree of life placing Chloroflexota near the origin of life and Archaea as a close relative of Actinomycetota. This taxon is not generally accepted and the three-domain system is followed.

A taxon called Hydrobacteria was defined in 2009 from a molecular phylogenetic analysis of core genes. It is in contrast to the other major group of eubacteria called Terrabacteria. Some researchers have used the name Gracilicutes in place of Hydrobacteria, but this does not agree with the original description of Gracilicutes by Gibbons and Murray, noted above, which included cyanobacteria and did not follow the three-domain system. Also as noted above, the use of Gracilicutes by Cavalier-Smith can be rejected because it was a major alteration of an earlier taxonomic name, was not based on a statistical analysis, and did not follow the three-domain system. The most recent genomic analyses have supported the division of Bacteria into two major superphyla, corresponding to Terrabacteria and Hydrobacteria.

Relationships

The phylogenetic tree according to the phylogenetic analyzes of Battistuzzi (2009) is the following and with a molecular clock calibration.

Recent phylogenetic analyzes have found that proteobacteria are a paraphyletic phylum that could encompass several recently discovered candidate phyla and other phyla such as Acidobacteriota, Chrysiogenota, Deferribacterota, and possibly Aquificota. This suggests that Gracilicutes or Hydrobacteria as a clade may comprise several candidates more closely related to Proteobacteria, Spirochaetes, PVC group, and FCB group than to bacteria from the clade Terrabacteria. Some of these phyla were classified as part of the proteobacteria. For example, Cavalier-Smith in his proposal of the 6 kingdoms included Acidobacteriota, Aquificota, Chrysiogenota, and Deferribacterota as part of the proteobacteria.

Phylogenetic analyzes have found roughly the following phylogeny between the major and some more closely related phyla.

According to the phylogenetic analysis of Hug (2016), the relationships could be the following.

According to the phylogenetic analysis of Zhu (2019), the relationships could be the following:

The following graph shows Cavalier-Smith's version of the tree of life, indicating the status of Gracilicutes. However, this tree is not supported by any molecular analysis so it should not be considered phylogenetic.

References 

Bacteria
Bacteriology
Infrakingdoms